Cissus quadrangularis is a perennial plant of the grape family. It is commonly known as veldt grape, winged treebine or adamant creeper. The species is native to tropical Asia, the Arabian Peninsula and much of Africa.

Description 
Along each angle is a leathery edge. Each has a tendril emerging from the opposite side of the node. Racemes of small white, yellowish, or greenish flowers; globular berries are red when ripe.

It is hardy to zone (UK) 10. Suitable for: light (sandy), medium (loamy) and heavy (clay) soils, prefers well-drained soil and can grow in nutritionally poor soil. Suitable pH: acid, neutral and basic (alkaline) soils and can grow in very acid and very alkaline soils. It cannot grow in the shade. It prefers dry or moist soil and can tolerate drought.

Traditional medicine 
Cissus quadrangularis has been used as a medicinal plant since antiquity. Cissus has been used in various Ayurvedic classical medicines to heal broken bones and injured ligaments and tendons. In siddha medicine, it is considered a tonic and analgesic, and is believed to help heal broken bones, thus its name asthisamharaka (that which prevents the destruction of bones). The Assamese people and the Garo tribe of Meghalaya and Bangladesh have used C. quadrangularis  for bone fracture.

Experimental studies 
C. quadrangularis has been studied for its effects in a rat model for osteoporosis. C. quadrangularis has been studied in animal models of bone fracture.

Its bactericidal effects on Helicobacter pylori indicate a potential use for treating gastric ulcers in conjunction with NSAID therapy.

The enzymatic and an in vitro cell culture study shows the potential anti-inflammatory and inhibitory properties of "cissus quadrangularis".

References

External links 

Austin, A. Jegadeesan, M. Gowrishankar, R. (2004) "Helicobactericidal Activity of Cissus quadrangularis L. Variant I"; Natural Product Sciences 10 (5): 217–219. Korean Society of Pharmacognosy.

Analysis of the effect of Asthishrinkhla Kandaswarasa [stem juice of Cissus quadrangularis] in fracture healing in a rat model 'Dr. Deepanshu K. Mishra, Prof. Sanjeev Sharma, R.G.G.P.G. Ayu. College - Paprola' Prof. V.K. Gupta, Dr. G.C. Negi College of Vet. and Animal sciences - Palampur - Dec. 2010.

Plants described in 1767
Flora of Africa
Flora of the Arabian Peninsula
Flora of tropical Asia
Plants used in Ayurveda
quadrangularis
Taxa named by Carl Linnaeus